Gasanabad is a village in the Jalilabad Rayon of Azerbaijan.

External links

Populated places in Jalilabad District (Azerbaijan)